Kansas Lake is a lake in Watonwan County, in the U.S. state of Minnesota.

Kansas Lake was not named after the state of Kansas; instead the name is a corruption of "Kensie's Lake", in honor of John Kensie, an English settler.

References

Lakes of Minnesota
Lakes of Watonwan County, Minnesota